Ludovico Gonzaga (also spelled Lodovico) was the name of several prominent members of the House of Gonzaga:

 Ludovico I Gonzaga (1268–1360), better known as Luigi, the first Capitano del Popolo ('Captain of the People') of Mantua and Imperial Vicar
 Ludovico II Gonzaga (1334–1382), Italian politician who was capitano del popolo of Mantua
 Ludovico III Gonzaga (1412–1478), also known as Ludovico II, Marquis of Mantua from 1444
 Ludovico Gonzaga (1480-1540) (c. 1480–1540), Italian nobleman and condottiero
 Ludovico Gonzaga-Nevers, also known as Luigi and Louis   (1539–1595), Duke of Nevers from 1565
 Ludovico Gonzaga (bishop) (1588–1632), Italian Roman Catholic bishop